The Huber Trophy (formerly known as the Tarry Cup) is the trophy awarded annually to the team that finishes the Colonial/United/International Hockey League regular season with the best overall record, as determined by points earned in the standings.

The regular season championship award was first presented in 1991–92.  It was renamed the Tarry Cup in 1994 in memory of Doug Tarry, who was the owner of the St. Thomas Wildcats, a charter member of the CoHL. On September 24, 2007, the trophy was given its current name in honor of the founder of the original International Hockey League, Fred Huber, which was awarded to the original league's regular-season champion.

Winners 
2007–08 — Fort Wayne Komets
2006–07 — Fort Wayne Komets
2005–06 — Kalamazoo Wings
2004–05 — Muskegon Fury
2003–04 — Fort Wayne Komets
2002–03 — Fort Wayne Komets
2001–02 — Quad City Mallards
2000–01 — Quad City Mallards
1999–00 — Quad City Mallards
1998–99 — Muskegon Fury
1997–98 — Quad City Mallards
1996–97 — Flint Generals
1995–96 — Flint Generals
1994–95 — Thunder Bay Senators
1993v94 — Thunder Bay Senators
1992–93 — Brantford Smoke
1991–92 — Michigan Falcons

References 
IHL's official site

International Hockey League (2007–2010)